Travon Marcel Potts (born June 3, 1970) is an American songwriter and record producer. He has a prolific discography. Potts is well known for writing for artists such as Monica, Christina Aguilera, Ahmed Chawki, Kenny Lattimore, Anastacia, Eternal, BeBe Winans, Trin-i-tee 5:7 and Public Announcement.   He was later brought in as a staff writer / producer for Nadir RedOne Khayat's RedOne Productions LLC. Potts co-wrote the 2014 theme song "Time of Our Lives" for beIN Sports.  Potts scored and wrote original music for Lifetime Network's Whitney directed by Angela Bassett. His music has also appeared in BMF (TV series), Swagger (TV series), Greenleaf, The Chi. Miracle in Lane 2, All About the Benjamins, Soul Plane and A Cross To Bear.

Early life
At the age of three, Potts started taking piano lessons in a Suzuki program at the University of Southern California. Over the next 14 years he studied classical music.  At the age of 12 he began to play piano for his church choir (Metropolitan Missionary Baptist Church) in Los Angeles, California.

In high school he began jazz training and started playing for the high school jazz band.  While in high school he developed his love for song writing.  At the age of 19 he co-wrote and co-produced his first song "Consider Me Yours" for Virgin recording artist Kipper Jones.  That same year Potts joined Faithful Central Baptist Church now known as Faithful Central Bible Church.

While at Faithful Central he began playing piano for the youth choir.

Ministry
After having success under the Silvercrest Entertainment brand, Travon's focus shifted toward music ministry.  A young gospel singing duo, ages 13 and 11 at the time, were brought to him as a possible project for development (Charles and Taylor).  After completing a demo package and shopping to different record labels, Jackie Patillo, GM of Integrity Music/Sony signed Charles and Taylor to a record deal.  Charles and Taylor went on to receive a Dove Award nomination for their self-titled project produced by Potts.  With this new focus on music ministry, Travon and his wife and business partner formed a new brand by the name of Providence Media Group.

Career
In 1997 Travon joined forces with prominent songwriter and producer Rhett Lawrence (who has produced Mariah Carey, Whitney Houston, BeBe and CeCe Winans and so on).  Though originally brought in as a keyboardist and programmer, Travon quickly was recognized by Lawrence as a songwriter.  The musical relationship between Rhett and Travon yielded many collaborations in song writing that led to songs on BeBe Winans ("Thank You"), The Honeys and multi-platinum selling EMI (UK) artist Eternal.  Eternal scored an overseas hit from this writing team ("Angel of Mine").  Monica also recorded and released "Angel of Mine" as a single from her The Boy Is Mine CD.  "Angel of Mine" went on to #1 on the Billboard pop chart for 4 weeks.  Travon went on to form his own production company, Silvercrest Entertainment.  Under the Silvercrest Entertainment brand Travon went on to write and produce songs for diamond selling artist Christina Aguilera ("Blessed"), Public Announcement ("It’s about time" #5 R&B, "Mamacita" #7 Pop), Trin-i-tee 5:7 ("Spiritual Love", "My Body" Top 10 gospel, "Rescue Me") and LaShell Griffin ("Faith", "Get Away"), Oprah Pop Star Challenge Winner. In December 2000, while expecting their third child (Clarke), Travon, his wife, son and daughter (Madison) moved to Alpharetta, Georgia.

Travon under the Providence Media Group brand was producer and executive producer to Charles & Taylor's self-titled Integrity Gospel / Sony release in July 2005. Providence Media Group then produced "Once again Mike Phillips" for Hidden Beach Recordings artist Mike Phillips.  Also, under this brand work began on the next project for popular CCM / Gospel artist Javen. Javen is well known for his work and ministry at Without Walls in Tampa Florida under Pastors Paula and Randy White. Travon and Tandria saw the vision to expand youth music ministry in Gospel and CCM within Providence Media Group.  They created the group The Net.  The Net was formed to train musically talented youth to use their talents for music ministry.  The Net met each week under the guidance of Travon and Tandria in a mentorship program.  In addition, Travon and Providence Media Group partnered with Destiny Style Records in Marietta, Georgia to produce Destiny Style Record artists.  Through this union Potts went on to produce the Gospel top 10 single ("His Will") for Destiny Praise on their self-titled album.  Potts left Destiny Style Records to expanded formed Clean Energy Entertainment with Tandria. Under this production company Potts went on to write ("One") with American Idol finalist Chris Sligh.  In 2011 Potts was brought on as music supervisor and scored the film, A Cross To Bear. In late 2013 Potts' left Universal Music Publishing. In 2014 Potts joined RedOne's production team. That year he co-wrote the theme for BeIN's network with famed songwriter producer Nadir RedOne Khayat's. Potts has gone on to score and write original music for Lifetime Network's Whitney directed by Angela Bassett. Potts music appeared in   Greenleaf, BMF (TV series), Swagger (TV series),  Our Kind of People  and The Chi. Potts was Music Supervisor for the holiday TV movie Adventures In Christmasing on VH1 starring Kim Fields who also served as Executive Producer.

References

External links
Travon Potts | Songs
 

https://books.google.com/books?id=zLUDAAAAMBAJ&pg=PA56&dq=Travon+Potts&hl=en&sa=X&ved=2ahUKEwjOmaz_p-T1AhVzkGoFHQroBnAQ6AF6BAgCEAI#v=onepage&q=Travon%20Potts&f=false
https://books.google.com/books?id=9QsEAAAAMBAJ&pg=PA21&dq=Travon+Potts&hl=en&sa=X&ved=2ahUKEwjOmaz_p-T1AhVzkGoFHQroBnAQ6AF6BAgDEAI#v=onepage&q=Travon%20Potts&f=false

1970 births
Living people
Christian music songwriters
American performers of Christian music
Songwriters from California
Record producers from California